Sergen Yatağan (born 17 May 1999) is a Turkish footballer who plays as a midfielder for Serik Belediyespor on loan from Bodrumspor.

Career
Yatağan is a youth product of the academies of Ilıca Belediyespor, Gençlerbirliği and Antalyaspor. He was promoted to the senior team in 2019, and signed a professional contract. He made his professional debut for Antalyaspor in a 3-3 Turkish Cup win over MKE Ankaragücü on 15 January 2019. He joined Bodrumspor on loan for the 2019-20 season, which was extended for another year after. He signed permanently with Bodrumspor in 2021, signing a 5-year contract with the club. On January 2022, he joined Karacabey Belediyespor on loan for the second half of the 2021-22 season. The following season, he was loaned to Serik Belediyespor in the TFF Second League.

References

External links
 
 
 

1999 births
People from Manavgat
Living people
Turkish footballers
Association football midfielders
Antalyaspor footballers
Karacabey Belediyespor footballers
Süper Lig players
TFF Second League players